Pristomyrmex bispinosus is a species of ant in the subfamily Myrmicinae. It was described by Donisthorpe in 1949.

References

External links

Myrmicinae
Insects described in 1949